The Caveman is a lost 1915 silent film comedy directed by Theodore Marston and starring Robert Edeson. It was produced by the Vitagraph Company of America and is based on a 1911 stage play, The Caveman.  Several of the scenes were filmed in the Homestead Steelworks.

It is based on a 1911 play by Gelette Burgess. The play starred Robert Edeson. The story was refilmed by Warner Brothers in 1926.

Plot

Cast
Robert Edeson - Hanlick Smagg
Fay Wallace - Madeline Mischief
Lillian Burns - Dolly Van Dream
George De Beck - Brewster Bradford
Frances Connelly - Mrs. Van Dream
John T. Kelly - Mr. Van Dream
Charles Eldridge - Theodore Glush
William Sellery - Solomon Huggins
Chick Morrison - Manager of Steel Plant

References

External links
The Caveman at IMDb.com

1915 films
American silent feature films
Films directed by Theodore Marston
American films based on plays
American black-and-white films
1915 comedy films
Lost American films
Silent American comedy films
Vitagraph Studios films
Lost comedy films
1915 lost films
1910s American films